The Jicarilla Mountains are a mountain range in Lincoln County, New Mexico in the southwestern United States. The Jicarilla Mountains were named after the Jicarilla Apache Nation. The Sacramento Mountains lie to the southwest.

In 1850 the first gold seekers began to arrive to the Jicarilla Mountains, but it would take time before the first mines were established. Jicarilla and White Oaks are two towns that were abandoned when the mines were no longer profitable in the early 1900s.

The range was also called the Sacramento Mountains.

References

 Julyan, Robert (2006). The Mountains of New Mexico. Albuquerque: University of New Mexico Press. 

Mountain ranges of New Mexico
Mountain ranges of Lincoln County, New Mexico